Handarap Lake is a high altitude water reservoir situated in the Shandur Valley in Gupis-Yasin District, the westernmost part of the Gilgit-Baltistan. The lake is an important source of fresh water and also a tourist attraction. It houses trout originating in the rivers.

Location 
Handarap Lake is located in Handarap Nallah, in the Handarap Valley or other valleys of Tehsil Phander Ghizer District, in Gilgit-Baltistan, Pakistan. Its estimated elevation is 3285 metres or 10777.6 ft above sea level. The lake is reached by taking the Karakoram Highway from Islamabad to Gilgit, then continuing west on the Gilgit-Chitral road towards Shandur. The final leg of the journey is a four-hour hike from the village of Handarp Valley, where lodging is available. Now from valley to Lake the Jeepable Road is constructing, this road would be better for the Tourist, they could travel by Van, Bike, and by bicycles also.

Handarap Lake is surrounded by snow-covered mountains in a variety of shapes including conical and cylindrical.

See also
 Gilgit River
 Phander Lake
 Khalti Lake
 Shandur Valley

References 

Lakes of Gilgit-Baltistan
Reservoirs in Pakistan
Lakes in Ghizer